Henry Inlet is a narrow, ice-filled inlet about  long, indenting the north coast of Thurston Island, Antarctica, immediately east of Hughes Peninsula. The inlet was first plotted from air photos taken by U.S. Navy Operation Highjump, 1946–47, and was named by the Advisory Committee on Antarctic Names for Robert Henry, a photographer's mate with the U.S. Navy Bellingshausen Sea Expedition, who in February 1960 recorded features along Eights Coast from helicopters.

Maps
 Thurston Island – Jones Mountains. 1:500000 Antarctica Sketch Map. US Geological Survey, 1967.
 Antarctic Digital Database (ADD). Scale 1:250000 topographic map of Antarctica. Scientific Committee on Antarctic Research (SCAR), 1993–2016.

References

Inlets of Ellsworth Land